Matthew Purssey (born 23 February 1981) is a British judoka.

Judo career
Purssey is a six times champion of Great Britain, winning titles in the lightweight, half-middleweight and middleweight divisions at the British Judo Championships in 2002, 2004, 2005, 2006, 2008 and 2011.

Other achievements

Three time British Open Champion
3rd place 2008 World Cup, Drammen, Norway
3rd place 2007 Super World Cup, Rotterdam, Netherlands
9th place 2003 World Championships, Osaka, Japan

Personal life
His brother Jonathan Purssey also won a British Championships title in 2008.

References

External links
 

1981 births
Living people
British male judoka
Commonwealth Games medallists in judo
Commonwealth Games silver medallists for Scotland
Judoka at the 2014 Commonwealth Games
Medallists at the 2014 Commonwealth Games